Maelstrom is the third book of the Destroyermen series by author Taylor Anderson.

Plot synopsis
Captain Matthew Reddy's ship Walker, and his Lemurian allies, have won several battles against the cannibalistic lizard race, the Grik, who are waging a war of genocide against the sea-going Lemurians. The Grik sent a large force of 500 ships carrying 150,000-200,000 soldiers to destroy the Captain's crew and base at Baalkpaan. The Japanese heavy cruiser, the Amagi, will be supporting the Grik lizard army. The Amagi is a more powerful vessel than Reddy's antique, battered destroyers. With these odds, how will the Captain and his allies fare? Can the ship 'Walker' under Captain Reddy and his Lemurian allies prevail against the Grik and their allied ship the Amagi? Will the Grik destroy the Captain's crew and base at Baalkpaan?

See also
 Destroyermen
 Taylor Anderson

References

External links
 

2009 American novels
American alternate history novels
Destroyermen and Artillerymen